Robert Thomas Seeley (born February 26, 1932, in Bryn Mawr, Pennsylvania, United States–died November 30, 2016, in Newton, Massachusetts) was a mathematician who worked on pseudo differential operators and the heat equation approach to the Atiyah–Singer index theorem.

Seeley did his undergraduate studies at Haverford College, and earned his Ph.D. from the Massachusetts Institute of Technology in 1959, under the supervision of Alberto Pedro Calderón. He taught at Harvey Mudd College and then in 1962 joined the faculty of Brandeis University. In 1972 he moved to the University of Massachusetts Boston; he retired as an emeritus professor. In 2012 he became a fellow of the American Mathematical Society.

References

1932 births
2016 deaths
20th-century American mathematicians
21st-century American mathematicians
Haverford College alumni
Massachusetts Institute of Technology alumni
Harvey Mudd College faculty
Brandeis University faculty
University of Massachusetts Boston faculty
People from Bryn Mawr, Pennsylvania
Mathematicians from Pennsylvania